Renal index may refer to:
Renal failure index: Urine Sodium * Plasma Creatinine / Urine Creatinine
Renal arterial resistivity index: (Systolic velocity - diastolic velocity) / Systolic velocity